Pengam (Mon) railway station served the village of Pengam, historically in Monmouthshire, Wales, from 1865 to 1962 on the Brecon and Merthyr Tydfil Junction Railway.

History 
The station was opened as Pengam on 14 June 1865 by the Brecon and Merthyr Tydfil Junction Railway. The station closed on 31 December 1962, although it remained open to goods for a few more years.

References 

Disused railway stations in Caerphilly County Borough
Former Brecon and Merthyr Tydfil Junction Railway stations
Railway stations in Great Britain opened in 1865
Railway stations in Great Britain closed in 1962
1865 establishments in Wales
1962 disestablishments in Wales